Harchoki  is a village located in Nowshera Virkan Tehsil of Gujranwala, Pakistan. The total population of this village is about 2,500.

Education 
There are two primary schools both for boys and girls in Harchoki Goraya. Students go to Buddha Goraya and Qila Mian Sing to attend high schools. Parents send their children to private schools in Gujranwala, Dhariwal and Sherakot.

Society and culture 
Punjabi is the main language spoken in the village. Most of the people earn income through agriculture, and they are associated with the Jatt, Warraich, Cheema, Kharal and Goraya clans.  There is also a considerable population of Christians.

References

Villages in Gujranwala District